News J is all year round Tamil news broadcasting channel headquartered at Nungambakkam in Chennai, Tamil Nadu and is run by Mantaro Network Private Limited, founded by Former Chief Minister of Tamil Nadu Edappadi K.Palaniswami, C.Ve.Radhaakrishnen, S.Dineshkumar, A.Vivek and K.Kubenthiran from Tamil Nadu. It is named after late AIADMK supremo J. Jayalalithaa.

This channel was launched on 14 November 2018 as a replacement of Jaya TV News. W. Hansraj Saxena is the CEO of the Channel.

References

External links 
 News J on YouTube

Television stations in Chennai
Tamil-language television channels
Television channels and stations established in 2017
2017 establishments in Tamil Nadu
Direct broadcast satellite services
Indian direct broadcast satellite services